The 1999–2000 British National League season was the fourth season of the British National League, the second level of ice hockey in Great Britain. 10 teams participated in the league, and the Fife Flyers won the championship.

Regular season

Playoffs

Group A

Group B

Semifinals 
 Fife Flyers - Solihull Blaze 2:0 (5:2, 5:4)
 Basingstoke Bison - Peterborough Pirates 2:0 (6:3, 4:2)

Final 
 Fife Flyers - Basingstoke Bison 3:0 (6:3, 2:1, 2:1)

External links 
 Season on hockeyarchives.info

British National League (1996–2005) seasons
United
2